Yuhi wa II Gahima II was Mwami of the Kingdom of Rwanda during the fifteenth century. A member of the Nyiginya dynasty, he reigned between 1444 and 1477.

References

15th-century monarchs in Africa
Rwandan kings